

Makin is a locality in the Australian state of South Australia located on the state’s south-east about  south-east of the state capital of Adelaide and about  north-west of the municipal seat of Bordertown.

Its name and boundaries for the locality were assigned in March 2000 for the portion within the Tatiara District Council while the portion within the Coorong District Council was added in August 2000.  Makin’s name is derived from the cadastral unit of the Hundred of Makin which was named after James Bain Makin (1855-1933), a pastoralist who lived in the vicinity of what is now the hundred.

The principal land use in the locality is primary production.

The 2016 Australian census which was conducted in August 2016 reports that Makin had a population of 30 people.

Makin is located within the federal division of Barker, the state electoral district of Mackillop and the local government area of the Tatiara District Council.

References

Limestone Coast
Towns in South Australia